Daniel Lee Murphy (born September 18, 1964) is former Major League Baseball pitcher. He batted and threw right-handed.

External links

1964 births
Living people
Baseball players from California
San Diego Padres players